Blairlinn is the site of one of Cumbernauld's several industrial estates built  as satellite developments on the periphery of the Scottish town's residential areas.

Toponymy
The etymology of the name is probably 'Pool, or mill-dam, plain’ (blàr linne).

Modern Estate
The modern industrial estate is about a mile south of the town centre. It was opened as Blairlinn Industrial Estate by the Secretary of State for Scotland on Friday, 22 September 1961. In 1962 Telehoist was one of the first companies to set up there. Some of the early factories were about 22,000 square feet with room for enlargement.

Large companies using the estate include Farmfoods, Dreams, and Mackintosh. There are over 20 other companies in the complex.

North of the estate is a steep glen through Luggiebank Wood which is now a nature reserve managed by the Scottish Wildlife Trust.

History

Before the building of the new town, there were three farmsteads known as Wester, Mid and Easter Blairlinn. All three were south of the Luggie Water with Wester Blairlinn near the east bank of the Shank Burn and Easter Blairlinn near the west bank of the Cameron Burn. Mid Blairlinn and Easter Blairlinn are reported to have had some coal within 900 feet of the surface. There seems to have been an old flax mill at Pettycastle, West Blairlinn. It is shown as a ruin on the first edition of the six inch ordnance survey map of Lanarkshire. Several other old maps show Blairlinn with various spellings including maps by Charles Ross, William Forrest, and William Roy.

References

Business parks of Scotland
Areas of Cumbernauld
Industrial parks in the United Kingdom
Economy of North Lanarkshire